Ryan Thomas Berube (born December 26, 1973) is an American former competition swimmer and freestyle specialist who won the gold medal anchoring the U.S. men's team in the 4×200-meter freestyle relay at the 1996 Summer Olympics in Atlanta, Georgia.

Berube has participated as a celebrity swimmer with Swim Across America, a charitable organization that raises money for cancer research. He lives with his wife, Michele, and their two sons Jack Berube and Rush Berube, in Dallas, Texas, where he is a wealth manager for UBS Private Wealth Management.

See also
 List of Olympic medalists in swimming (men)
 List of Southern Methodist University people

References
 
  Ryan Berube – Olympic swimmer profile at Swim Across America

1973 births
Living people
American male freestyle swimmers
Olympic gold medalists for the United States in swimming
Pan American Games gold medalists for the United States
People from Tequesta, Florida
Swimmers from Florida
SMU Mustangs men's swimmers
Swimmers at the 1995 Pan American Games
Swimmers at the 1996 Summer Olympics
Medalists at the 1996 Summer Olympics
Pan American Games medalists in swimming
Universiade medalists in swimming
Universiade gold medalists for the United States
Medalists at the 1995 Pan American Games